The 1996–97 season was the 117th season of competitive football by Rangers.

Overview
Rangers played a total of 52 competitive matches during the 1996–97 season. The team finished first in the Scottish Premier Division and won its ninth consecutive league title, equalling the long-standing record of their rivals Celtic

In the cup competitions, the team won the Scottish League Cup beating Heart of Midlothian 4–3 in the final. Rangers were knocked out the Scottish Cup by Celtic at the quarter final stage, losing 2–0.

The side reached the group stages of the UEFA Champions League this season and were drawn into a group with Grasshopper, Auxerre and Ajax.

Between July and March, manager Walter Smith spent £10 million on new signings Jörg Albertz, Joachim Björklund and Sebastián Rozental.

Due to the mounting injuries in the second half of the season, striker Mark Hateley briefly returned to the club from Queens Park Rangers for a fee of £300,000. Manchester City goalkeeper Andy Dibble joined on a free transfer as cover for the injured Andy Goram.

Transfers

In

Out

Expendure:  £10,000,000
Income:  £0
Total loss/gain:  £10,000,000

Results
All results are written with Rangers' score first.

Scottish Premier Division

UEFA Champions League

League Cup

Scottish Cup

Appearances

League table

References 

Rangers F.C. seasons
Rangers
Scottish football championship-winning seasons